Central Bridge is a hamlet and census-designated place (CDP) within the towns of Schoharie and Esperance in Schoharie County, New York, United States. As of the 2010 census, the population was 593.

Central Bridge is in northeastern Schoharie County, in the northwestern part of the town of Schoharie and the southwestern section  of Esperance. It is in the valley of Cobleskill Creek where it joins Schoharie Creek, a northward-flowing tributary of the Mohawk River. It is bordered to the south by Interstate 88 and to the east by Schoharie Creek.

The hamlet of Old Central Bridge is in the southern part of the CDP.

Demographics

Notable person
George Westinghouse, pioneer in the electrical industry; born in Central Bridge

References 

Census-designated places in Schoharie County, New York
Census-designated places in New York (state)